The Caridea, commonly known as caridean shrimp or true shrimp, are an infraorder of shrimp within the order Decapoda. This infraorder contains all species of true shrimp. They are found widely around the world in both fresh and salt water. Many other animals with similar names – such as the mud shrimp of Axiidea and the boxer shrimp of Stenopodidea – are not true shrimp, but many have evolved features similar to true shrimp.

Biology
Carideans are found in every kind of aquatic habitat, with the majority of species being marine. Around a quarter of the described species are found in fresh water, however, including almost all the members of the species-rich family Atyidae and the Palaemonidae subfamily Palaemoninae. They include several commercially important species, such as Macrobrachium rosenbergii, and are found on every continent except Antarctica.

In addition to the great variety in habitat, carideans vary greatly in form, from species a few millimetres long when fully grown, to those that grow to over a foot long. Except where secondarily lost, shrimp have one pair of stalked eyes, although they are sometimes covered by the carapace, which protects the cephalothorax. The carapace also surrounds the gills, through which water is pumped by the action of the mouthparts.

Most carideans are omnivorous, but some are specialised for particular modes of feeding. Some are filter feeders, using their setose (bristly) legs as a sieve; some scrape algae from rocks. The snapping shrimp of the genus Alpheus snap their claws to create a shock wave that stuns prey. Many cleaner shrimp, which groom reef fish and feed on their parasites and necrotic tissue, are carideans. In turn, carideans are eaten by various animals, particularly fish and seabirds, and frequently host bopyrid parasites.

Lifecycle
Unlike Dendrobranchiates, Carideans brood their eggs rather than releasing them into the water. Caridean larvae undergo all naupliar development within the egg, and eclose as a zoea. The zoea stage feeds on phytoplankton. There can be as few as two zoea stages, (e.g. some freshwater Palaemonidae), or as many as 13, (e.g. some Pandalidae). The post-zoeal larva, often called a decapodid, resembles a miniature adult, but retains some larval characteristics. The decapodid larva will metamorphose a final time into a post-larval juvenile: a young shrimp having all the characteristics of adults. Most adult carideans are benthic animals living primarily on the sea floor.

Common species include Pandalus borealis (the "pink shrimp"), Crangon crangon (the "brown shrimp") and the snapping shrimp of the genus Alpheus.

Commercial fishing

The most significant commercial species among the carideans is Pandalus borealis, followed by Crangon crangon. The wild-capture production of P. borealis is about ten times that of C. crangon. In 1950, the position was reversed, with the capture of C. crangon about ten times that of P. borealis.

In 2010, the global aquaculture of all shrimp and prawn species (3.5 million tonnes) slightly exceeded the global wild capture (3.2 million tonnes). No carideans were significantly involved in aquaculture, but about 430,000 tonnes were captured in the wild. That is, about 13% of the global wild capture, or about 6% of the total production of all shrimp and prawns, were carideans.

Systematics and related taxa

Shrimp of the infraorder Caridea are more closely related to lobsters and crabs than they are to the members of the sub-order Dendrobranchiata (prawns). Biologists distinguish these two groups based on differences in their gill structures. The gill structure is lamellar in carideans but branching in dendrobranchiates. The easiest practical way to separate true shrimp from dendrobranchiates is to examine the second abdominal segment. The second segment of a carideans overlaps both the first and the third segment, while the second segment of a dendrobranchiate overlaps only the third segment. They also differ in that carideans typically have two pairs of chelae (claws), while dendrobranchiates have three. A third group, the Stenopodidea, contains around 70 species and differs from the other groups in that the third pairs of legs is greatly enlarged.

Procarididea are the sister group to the Caridea, comprising only eleven species.

The cladogram below shows Caridea's relationships to other relatives within Decapoda, from analysis by Wolfe et al., 2019.

The below cladogram shows the internal relationships of eight selected families within Caridea, with the Atyidae (freshwater shrimp) being the most basal:

Taxonomy
The infraorder Caridea is divided into 15 superfamilies:

Fossil record
The fossil record of the Caridean is sparse, with only 57 exclusively fossil species known. The earliest of these cannot be assigned to any family, but date from the Lower Jurassic and Cretaceous. A number of extinct genera cannot be placed in any superfamily:

Acanthinopus Pinna, 1974
Alcmonacaris Polz, 2009
Bannikovia Garassino & Teruzzi, 1996
Blaculla Münster, 1839
Buergerocaris Schweigert & Garassino, 2004
Gampsurus von der Marck, 1863
Hefriga Münster, 1839
Leiothorax Pinna, 1974
Parvocaris Bravi & Garassino, 1998
Pinnacaris Garassino & Teruzzi, 1993

See also  
 
 Dendrobranchiata

References

External links
 
 

 
Arthropod infraorders
Commercial crustaceans
Edible crustaceans
Extant Early Jurassic first appearances
Seafood
Taxa named by James Dwight Dana

nrm:Chèrvette
simple:Shrimp